Battle of al-Qaryatayn was a minor battle between the Ghassanid Arab allies of the Byzantine empire, and the Rashidun Caliphate army. It was fought after Khalid ibn Walid had conquered Tadmur in Syria. His army marched to al-Qaryatayn, the inhabitants of which resisted the Muslims. They were fought, defeated and plundered.

References 
 A.I. Akram, The Sword of Allah: Khalid bin al-Waleed, His Life and Campaigns, Nat. Publishing. House, Rawalpindi (1970) .

External links 
 A.I. Akram, The Sword of Allah: Khalid bin al-Waleed, His Life and Campaigns Lahore, 1969

634
al-Qaryatayn
Qarteen
Muslim conquest of the Levant